Pogonocherini is a tribe of longhorn beetles of the subfamily Lamiinae.

Taxonomy
Alphomorphus Linsley, 1935
Callipogonius Linsley, 1935
Cristhybolasius Breuning, 1959
Ecteneolus Bates, 1885
Ecyrus LeConte, 1852
Estoloderces Melzer, 1928
Hybolasiellus Breuning, 1959
Hybolasiopsis Breuning, 1959
Hybolasius Bates, 1874
Hypomia Thomson, 1868
Lophopogonius Linsley, 1935
Lypsimena Haldeman, 1847
Pogonocherus Dejean, 1821
Poliaenus Bates, 1880
Polyacanthia Montrouzier, 1861
Pygmaeopsis Schaeffer, 1908
Soluta Lacordaire, 1872
Spinohybolasius Breuning, 1959
Zaplous LeConte, 1878

References

 
Beetle tribes